Vaskút (German: Waschkut or Eisenbrunn, Croatian: Baškut or Vaškut) is a large village in Bács-Kiskun county, in the Southern Great Plain region of southern Hungary.

Geography
It covers an area of 71.49 km². It has a population of 3327 people (2015).

Demographics
  Magyars
  Germans
  Croats
  Bunjevci

Before 1945, there was high share of Germans (Danube Swabians) in Vaskút's population, that spoke their own dialect of German language. 
After the war, numerous Magyars (Szeklers from Bukovina and Csángós from Moldavia) were settled here.

Notable persons
 Stefan Schoblocher (1937), writer
 Fabijan Peštalić (1845–1909), Franciscan, important personality of national movement of the Danubian Croats
 Grgur Peštalić (1755–1809), Franciscan, Croatian writer
 Bede Lackner (1927–2020), Catholic priest and monk

References

Populated places in Bács-Kiskun County
Hungarian German communities